1982 Out of the Blue was a various artists "hits" compilation album released in Australia in 1982 on the Festival record label (Catalogue No. RML 50003). The album spent five weeks at the top of the Australian album charts in 1982.

Track listing

Charts

References

1982 compilation albums
Pop compilation albums
Festival Records compilation albums